Erard may refer to:

 St. Erard or Erhard of Regensburg, bishop of Regensburg in the 7th century
 Erard I, Count of Brienne (1060 - 1114)
 Sébastien Érard (1752 - 1831), French instrument maker of German origin who specialised in the production of pianos and harps
 Erard (company), renowned musical instrument maker, mainly of pianos and harps, founded by Sébastien Érard and based in Paris, France